Spent nuclear fuel storage can refer to:

Dry cask storage, a method of storing high-level radioactive waste that has already been cooled
Spent fuel pool

See also
Nuclear fuel cycle
Spent nuclear fuel
Nuclear flask